Albert Pintat Santolària (born 23 June 1943) is an Andorran citizen, who served as the prime minister of Andorra from 27 February 2005 to 5 June 2009.

Pintat graduated from the University of Fribourg in Switzerland in 1967, majoring in economics.

He is a member of the Liberal Party of Andorra and was the foreign minister of Andorra from 1997 to 2001. He also served as Ambassador to the European Union (1995 to 1997) and to Switzerland and the United Kingdom (2001 to 2004).

He held the position of head of government since being appointed by the General Council on 20 February 2005 until 5 June 2009.

External links
Official site
New York Times: Albert Pintat, From Tiny Andorra to the U.N. Center Stage

Heads of Government of Andorra
1943 births
Living people
Foreign Ministers of Andorra
Liberal Party of Andorra politicians
Government ministers of Andorra
Ambassadors of Andorra to the European Union
Ambassadors of Andorra to Switzerland
Ambassadors of Andorra to the United Kingdom
University of Fribourg alumni
Andorran economists